The 2007–08 UEFA Cup was the 37th edition of the UEFA Cup, UEFA's second-tier club football tournament. The final was played at the City of Manchester Stadium, Manchester, England on 14 May 2008 between Rangers of Scotland and Zenit Saint Petersburg of Russia. Zenit won the match 2–0, with goals from Igor Denisov and Konstantin Zyryanov, to claim their first UEFA Cup title. The first qualifying games were played on 19 July 2007 and the main tournament commenced on 20 September 2007. A total of 123 football clubs took part in the tournament (including its qualifying rounds).

Each European football nation is represented by a different number of its associate clubs, depending on the UEFA coefficients. Budućnost Podgorica was the first team from Montenegro to enter the competition.

The semi-final between Zenit and Bayern Munich was alleged to have been fixed. Both clubs denied the allegations, and the UEFA probe found no wrongdoing on either part.

Sevilla could not defend their title as they automatically qualified for the 2007–08 UEFA Champions League and also reached the knockout stage.

The tournament's top scorers were Pavel Pogrebnyak of Zenit Saint Petersburg and Luca Toni of Bayern Munich, each with 10 goals.

Round and draw dates

Teams

Notes

Qualifying rounds

First qualifying round
The draw, which was conducted by UEFA General Secretary David Taylor and Michele Centenaro, UEFA's head of club competitions, was held on Friday, 29 June 2007 at 13:30 CET in Nyon, Switzerland. The matches were played on 19 July and 2 August 2007.

|-
!colspan="5"|Southern-Mediterranean region
|-

|-
!colspan="5"|Central-East region
|-

|-
!colspan="5"|Northern region
|-

|}

1 This match was played at Partizan Stadium in Belgrade.
2 UEFA expelled Partizan from the 2007–08 UEFA Cup due to crowd trouble at their away tie in Mostar, which forced the match to be interrupted for 10 minutes. UEFA adjudged travelling Partizan fans to have been the culprits of the trouble, but Partizan were allowed to play the return leg while the appeal was being processed. However, Partizan's appeal was rejected so Zrinjski Mostar qualified.
3 This match was played at Szusza Ferenc Stadium in Budapest because MTK Budapest's ground in Budapest does not meet UEFA standards.
4 This match was played at Zimbru Stadium in Chişinău because FC Nistru Otaci's ground in Otaci does not meet UEFA standards.

Second qualifying round
The draw, which was conducted by UEFA General Secretary David Taylor and Giorgio Marchetti, UEFA's director of professional football, was held on Friday, 3 August 2007 at 13:00 CET in Nyon, Switzerland. The matches were played on 16 and 30 August 2007.

|-
!colspan="5"|Southern-Mediterranean region
|-

|-
!colspan="5"|Central-East region
|-

|-
!colspan="5"|Northern region
|-

|}

First round

The draw, which was conducted by UEFA General Secretary David Taylor and Gérard Houllier, the winning coach in the 2000–01 tournament, was held on Friday, 31 August 2007 at 13:00 CET in Monaco. The matches were played on 20 September and 4 October 2007.

|-
!colspan="5"|Group 1

|-
!colspan="5"|Group 2

|-
!colspan="5"|Group 3

|-
!colspan="5"|Group 4

|-
!colspan="5"|Group 5

|-
!colspan="5"|Group 6

|-
!colspan="5"|Group 7

|-
!colspan="5"|Group 8

|}

1 This match was played at Panthessaliko Stadium in Volos because AEL's ground (Alkazar Stadium in Larissa) would not meet UEFA standards.

Group stage

The draw, which was conducted by UEFA's director of professional football Giorgio Marchetti and Michele Centenaro, UEFA's head of club competitions, was held on Tuesday, 9 October 2007 at 12:00 CET in Nyon, Switzerland.

The top three teams (highlighted in green) of each group qualified for the next round. Based on paragraph 6.06 in the UEFA regulations for the current season, if two or more teams were equal on points on completion of all the group matches, the following criteria were applied to determine the rankings:
superior goal difference from all group matches played;
higher number of goals scored in all group matches played;
higher number of goals scored away in all group matches played;
higher number of wins;
higher number of away wins;
higher number of coefficient points accumulated by the club in question, as well as its association, over the previous five seasons (see paragraph 8.03 of the UEFA regulations).

Group A

Group B

Group C

Group D

Group E

Group F

Group G

Group H

Knockout stage

All of the rounds in the final phase are two-legged, except for the final. In the event of aggregate scores being equal after normal time in the second leg, the winning team will be that which scored more goals on their away leg: if the scores in the two matches were identical, extra time is played. The away goals rule also applies if scores are equal at the end of extra time. If there are no goals scored in extra time, the tie is decided on a penalty shoot out. The team first out of the hat in each tie plays the first leg of their tie at home, and the second leg away.

Bracket

Round of 32
The draw for the round of 32, which was conducted by UEFA General Secretary David Taylor and Michele Centenaro, UEFA's head of club competitions, was held on Friday, 21 December 2007 at 13:00 CET in Nyon, Switzerland. The eight group winners were drawn against the eight third-placed teams, while the eight second-placed teams were drawn against the eight teams who finished third in the Champions League groups. Teams from the same group or the same country cannot be drawn together.

The first legs were played on 13 and 14 February 2008. The second legs were played on 21 February 2008.

Round of 16
The draw for the Round of 16, which was conducted by UEFA General Secretary David Taylor, was also held on Friday, 21 December 2007 at 13:00 CET in Nyon, Switzerland. The first legs were played on 6 March 2008. The second legs were played on 12 and 13 March 2008. Unlike the previous rounds, teams from the same group or country may be drawn together from the round of 16 onwards.

Quarter-finals
The draw for the quarter-finals, semi-finals and final, which was conducted by UEFA General Secretary David Taylor and Denis Law, the ambassador for the final in Manchester, was held on Friday, 14 March 2008 at 14:00 CET in Nyon, Switzerland. The first legs of the quarter-finals were played on 3 April and the second legs were played on 10 April 2008.

Semi-finals
The semi-final matches were played on 24 April and 1 May 2008.

Final

The final was contested by Russian side Zenit Saint Petersburg and Scottish side Rangers on 14 May 2008 at the City of Manchester Stadium in Manchester, England. Zenit won the match 2–0, with goals from Igor Denisov and Konstantin Zyryanov coming in the last 20 minutes of the game to give Zenit their first UEFA Cup title.

Top goalscorers
The top scorers in the 2007–08 UEFA Cup are the following:

Sources: Top Scorers Final - Wednesday 14 May 2008 (after match)

See also
2007–08 UEFA Champions League
2007 UEFA Intertoto Cup
2008 UEFA Super Cup

References

External links
2007–08 All matches UEFA Cup – season at UEFA website
 All scorers 2007–08 UEFA Cup according to (excluding preliminary round) according to protocols UEFA + all scorers preliminary round
2007/08 UEFA Cup - results and line-ups (archive)

 
UEFA Cup seasons
2007–08 in European football